Hiralal is a given name. Notable people with the name include:

Hiralal (actor), Indian film actor
Shirish Hiralal Chaudhari, member of the 13th Maharashtra Legislative Assembly
Hiralal Datta (born 1959), Indian cricketer
Hiralal Gaekwad (1923–2003), Indian cricketer
Bahwandi Hiralal (born 1951), former Malaysian football player
Hiralal J Kania or H. J. Kania (1890–1951), the first Chief Justice of India
Madhukar Hiralal Kania (born 1927), the 23rd Chief Justice of India
Hiralal Macchi, Indian cricketer
Hiralal Mukherjee (1886–1962), Indian professional footballer
Hiralal Pippal, Indian politician from the state of the Madhya Pradesh
Hiralal Sen (1866–1917), Indian photographer, one of India's first filmmakers
Hiralal Shastri (1899–1974), Indian politician, first chief minister of Rajasthan state
Dhirendra Hiralal Waghela (born 1954), the Chief Justice of the Bombay High Court

See also
Hiralal Bhakat College, established in 1986 in Nalhati, India
Nabagram Hiralal Paul College, also known as Konnagar College, established in 1957 in Konnagar, West Bengal, India
Hero Hiralal, 1988 film directed by Ketan Mehta, starring Naseeruddin Shah and Sanjana Kapoor
Hiralal Majumdar Memorial College for Women, established in 1959, in Dakshineswar, Kolkata